Joseph Obinna Nwafor (born May 5, 1983) is a Nigerian professional football striker who most recently played for Unión Comercio in the Peruvian Primera División.

References

External links
Fehu Promotiom

1983 births
Living people
Nigerian footballers
Nigerian expatriate footballers
Super League Greece players
Doxa Katokopias FC players
Aris Limassol FC players
OFI Crete F.C. players
Paniliakos F.C. players
Expatriate footballers in Greece
Cypriot First Division players
AEK Larnaca FC players
Hakoah Maccabi Amidar Ramat Gan F.C. players
Amanat Baghdad players
Expatriate footballers in Israel
Nigerian expatriate sportspeople in Greece
Expatriate footballers in Vietnam
Peruvian Primera División players
Unión Comercio footballers
Expatriate footballers in Peru
Expatriate footballers in Iraq
Nigerian expatriates in Iraq
Association football forwards